The discography of Brian Fallon, an American singer-songwriter and musician. His debut studio album, Painkillers, was released in March 2016. The album peaked at number thirty on the Billboard 200. The album includes the single "A Wonderful Life". His second studio album, Sleepwalkers, was released in February 2018. The album peaked at number forty-two on the Billboard 200. The album includes the singles "Forget Me Not", "If Your Prayers Don't Get to Heaven", "See You on the Other Side" and "My Name Is the Night (Color Me Black)". His third studio album, Local Honey, was released in March 2020. The album includes the singles "You Have Stolen My Heart", "21 Days" and "When You're Ready". Fallon released his fourth studio album, Night Divine, in November 2021.

Studio albums

Extended plays

Singles

Other appearances

Music videos

References

Discographies of American artists